Höhnhart is a municipality in the district of Braunau am Inn in the Austrian state of Upper Austria.

Geography
Höhnart lies in the Innviertel southeast of Braunau am Inn. About 29 percent of the municipality is forest and 63 percent farmland.

References

Cities and towns in Braunau am Inn District